Sir Nathaniel Johnson (7 April 1644 – 1 July 1712) was a soldier and a Member of Parliament (MP) for Newcastle upon Tyne, 1680–1689. He was governor of the Leeward Islands (1686) and the Province of Carolina (1703–1709).

Biography 
Nathaniel Johnson was born on 7 April 1644, near Kibbelsworth, Durham. He joined the British Army in his youth. Eventually, he joined the Member of Parliament (MP) for Newcastle upon Tyne, 1680–1689. In 1686, he was appointed governor of the Leeward Islands, governing Treves, Saint Kitts, Montserrat, and Antigua. He travelled to the Province of Carolina in 1689, becoming its governor in 1703.  While he started his government sanctioned "a blow at the Spanish interest directed against Louisiana and Florida: the Apalachee expedition of 1704". In 1702, while he governed there, he oversaw the defense of Charles Town against an attempted Franco-Spanish assault. In addition, he created the Parish system in this colony. Johnson rejected the constitutions of church and state because he believed these were dissenters of all denominations. So, to reduce or eliminate their power and influence, the Commons House of Assembly established a new bill that expulsed to the dissenters (who were mostly in South Carolina) of the Common House. The bill forced to the people who would want to be chosen in the Assembly accept and practice the rites of the Church of England, doing an oath, subscribing to a declaration and receiving a sacrament own of this church. The dissenters refused this measure because they thought the governor had taken away their civil rights and religious liberties. The residents of Colleton County, elaborated and written about his "grievous circumstances" and gave it to the Lords Proprietors with order that they remove the law.  It was enacted, that twenty lay-persons be constituted a corporation for the exercise of ecclesiastical jurisdiction, with full power to deprive ministers of their livings at pleasure, not for immorality only, but also for imprudence, or on account of unreasonable prejudices taken against them. He ended his term in 1709 and died 1 July 1712 in Berkeley County, South Carolina.

Johnson had, at least, two children: Robert, also a future Governor of South Carolina, and Ann (who married Gov. Thomas Broughton).

References

1644 births
1712 deaths
People of the War of the Spanish Succession
Colonial governors of South Carolina
English MPs 1680–1681
English MPs 1681
English MPs 1685–1687